The Besal, properly named "Gun, Light, Machine, Faulkner, .303-inch", was a light machine gun of British origin. The weapon was intended as an alternative to the Bren gun as it was lighter, simpler, cheaper and easier to manufacture and therefore was not dependent on the Royal Small Arms Factory, Enfield which was within range of German bombers. As the threat to the supply of Brens receded, it was eventually deemed unnecessary and never went into mass production.

The design was by Harry Faulkner of the Birmingham Small Arms Company, which also manufactured the larger Besa machine gun which like the Bren was a product of the pre-war Czech arms manufacturer. That weapon's name was a nickname for Birmingham Small Arms (BSA) and the Besal was to be a lighter version; a Besa-light. This was however not an official designation.

References

External links
https://web.archive.org/web/20130115040831/http://www.archivingindustry.com/Militaryfirearms/brenpage.htm
http://www.acant.org.au/Articles/MGs_inBritishService.html
http://i150.photobucket.com/albums/s97/bongomania/Besal2.jpg

Light machine guns
World War II infantry weapons of the United Kingdom
Machine guns of the United Kingdom
History of the London Borough of Enfield
Military equipment introduced from 1940 to 1944